Eternal Lord was an English deathcore band that formed in 2005 and disbanded in 2009.

History
Eternal Lord was formed in 2005 by the remaining band members of The Hunt for Ida Wave and Burning Skies. Shortly after an EP was released featuring an original vocalist (leaving to pursue a different career path) he was replaced by former The Hunt for Ida Wave and I Killed The Prom Queen vocalist Ed Butcher. This enabled the band to move to the next platform and sign to Golf Records and Ferret Music USA. Throughout April 2007 they toured with All That Remains on their "The Fall Of Ideals European Tour 2007" alongside Textures and Misery Signals.

Their debut album, written by Butcher & GregoryBlessed Be This Nightmare, was released throughout the UK and Europe in March 2008 via Golf Records and in the US via Ferret Music. Still available to stream and download online. In May 2008 drummer Stuart Mckay abruptly quit the band, just prior to them embarking on a US tour with The Acacia Strain, All Shall Perish, and Since The Flood. In July 2008, Edward Thrower was announced as the band's new drummer. However, during the band's UK summer headline tour of 2008 Ed Butcher quit Eternal Lord to progress his career as a Firefighter.

Band members
Final Lineup 
 Edward Butcher – lead vocals, writer (2007-2008)
 Chris Gregory – guitar (2005-2008)
 Shaun Zerebecki – guitar (2005-2008)
 Nick Gardner – bass guitar (2005-2008)
 Edward Thrower - drums, percussion (2008)

Former members
Sam Ricketts – lead vocals (2005-2007)
Stu Mckay – drums, percussion (2005-2008)

Discography
Albums
Blessed Be This Nightmare (Golf Records, 2008)

References

Musical groups established in 2005
Musical groups disestablished in 2009
Deathcore musical groups
English deathcore musical groups
English metalcore musical groups
Ferret Music artists